Josiah Wise (born July 9, 1988), known professionally as serpentwithfeet, is an experimental musician based in Brooklyn, New York City. Wise released the EP Blisters in 2016, his debut studio album soil in 2018, his second EP Apparition in 2020, and his second studio album Deacon in 2021.

Early life
Wise was raised in Baltimore, Maryland. He grew up in a religious family; his father owned a Christian bookstore and his mother was a choir director. Wise joined the church choir as a child and grew up with classical and gospel music as a primary influence.

When he was 11 years old his mother asked him if he wanted to audition for the Maryland State Boychoir and he refused, so she signed him up anyway and he ended up loving it. This was his introduction to classical vocal music. He realized from this experience that there was a lack of diversity in the choir and there was "not much room for the black voice."

He attended high school at Baltimore City College, a school for gifted and talented students that was known for their internationally competitive choir. At the age of 14, he competed in choir competitions with his school choir in Europe and won trophies. He said in an interview with Loud and Quiet: "It was all black kids, but our repertoire was predominantly classical. And that blew my mind." After this, Wise decided that he wanted to become a world-class performer and he started taking vocal lessons to become a classically trained opera singer.

He later moved to Philadelphia, where he attended the University of the Arts. Although Wise was initially interested in becoming a classical opera singer, he was rejected from conservatories he applied to.

Career
After leaving the University of the Arts, Wise spent time in Paris and in Philadelphia's neo-soul scene. However, his voice was seen as closer in tone to opera than to his peers in neo-soul. Wise then moved to New York, where he released his first single "Curiosity of Other Men" in 2014.

The song led to Wise's eventual signing with Tri Angle in 2015 and the release of Wise's debut EP, Blisters, in 2016. The EP featured production from the Haxan Cloak, who has worked with artists including Björk and the Body. Blisters debuted to extremely positive reviews from critics.

Wise began work on his debut studio album Soil in 2017 with producers including Clams Casino, Katie Gately, and Adele collaborator Paul Epworth. The album was released on June 8, 2018, to positive reviews from critics.

In 2017, Wise went on tour with the band Grizzly Bear as their opener. On the Brockhampton album Iridescence (2018), Serpentwithfeet features on the song "Tonya", which was first performed live on The Tonight Show Starring Jimmy Fallon. He appeared on a remix of Björk's "Blissing Me" (2017), and performed in concert with Björk on her 2019 Cornucopia tour. In 2019, he also served as the opening act in selected dates of Rosalía's El Mal Querer Tour.

On June 26, 2019, he released a song "Receipts", which featured Ty Dolla Sign. In 2020, Wise was featured in a track titled "Start" in Ellie Goulding's fourth studio album Brightest Blue, and collaborated with Ty Dolla Sign again by singing background vocals and writing on Ty Dolla Sign's song "Ego Death", a collaborative track with Kanye West, FKA Twigs, and Skrillex, and additionally appeared on an interlude on Ty Dolla Sign's 2020 album, Featuring Ty Dolla Sign.

On March 30, 2020, Wise released the single "A Comma" in collaboration with Adult Swim. He also announced his upcoming EP Apparition, via Secretly Canadian. Apparition was released on April 29, 2020. Made up of three songs, it includes the single "A Comma", "This Hill", and "Psychic".

On January 8, 2021, he was featured in Virgil Abloh's single titled "Delicate Limbs".

In January 2021, Serpentwithfeet announced his second studio album Deacon, and release the lead single "Fellowship", co-produced with Sampha and Lil Silva. The album released on March 26.

In August 2022, Serpentwithfeet released "On Air", a collaboration with Moby, released on the Always Centered at Night label. On September 30, 2022, he was featured on "Fungal City", one of the songs on Björk's album Fossora, marking their second collaboration.

Personal life
Wise is gay and from a young age used gospel music to express his sexuality.

Discography

Studio albums

EPs

Singles

Collaborations 
 2013 Gifts for Shitenno
 2021 Luvaroq
 2022 On Air

Music videos 
 four ethers (November 17, 2016)
 cherubim (May 2, 2018)
 bless your heart (May 7, 2018)
 Fellowship (January 25, 2021)

External links

References 

1988 births
American experimental musicians
American gay musicians
Living people
LGBT people from Maryland
LGBT African Americans
American LGBT singers
Musicians from Baltimore
University of the Arts (Philadelphia) alumni
Secretly Canadian artists
20th-century LGBT people
21st-century American LGBT people